Aberrant subclavian artery, or aberrant subclavian artery syndrome, is a rare anatomical variant of the origin of the right or left subclavian artery.  This abnormality is the most common congenital vascular anomaly of the aortic arch, occurring in approximately 1% of individuals.

Presentation
This condition is usually asymptomatic. The aberrant artery usually arises just distal to the left subclavian artery and crosses in the posterior part of the mediastinum on its way to the right upper extremity. In 80% of individuals it crosses behind the esophagus. Such course of this aberrant vessel may cause a vascular ring around the trachea and esophagus.
Dysphagia due to an aberrant right subclavian artery is termed dysphagia lusoria, although this is a rare complication. In addition to dysphagia, aberrant right subclavian artery may cause stridor, dyspnoea, chest pain, or fever. An aberrant right subclavian artery may compress the recurrent laryngeal nerve causing a palsy of that nerve, which is termed Ortner's syndrome.

The aberrant right subclavian artery frequently arises from a dilated segment of the proximal descending aorta, the so-called Diverticulum of Kommerell (which was named for the German radiologist Burkhard Friedrich Kommerell (1901–1990), who discovered it in 1936). It is alternatively known as a lusorian artery.

Pathophysiology

In the normal embryological development of the aortic arches, the right dorsal aorta regresses caudal to the origin of the 7th intersegmental artery which gives rise to the right subclavian artery. In formation of an aberrant right subclavian artery, the regression occurs instead between the 7th intersegmental artery and the right common carotid so that the right subclavian artery is then connected to the left dorsal aorta via the part of the right dorsal aorta which normally regresses. During growth, the origin of the right subclavian artery migrates until it is just distal to that of the left subclavian.

Diagnosis

Treatment
Surgery is occasionally used to treat the condition.

Images

See also
 Dysphagia lusoria

References

External links 

Anatomical pathology
Congenital vascular defects